Nathan Bedford Forrest Monument may refer to:

Nathan Bedford Forrest Monument (Memphis, Tennessee), former monument in Memphis, Tennessee
Nathan Bedford Forrest Bust, bust in the Tennessee State Museum in Nashville, Tennessee
Nathan Bedford Forrest Statue, former statue in Nashville, Tennessee